Nong Bua City Football Club (Thai หนองบัว ซิตี้), is a Thai football club based in Nong Bua Lamphu, Thailand. The club is currently playing in the 2017 Thailand Amateur League North Eastern Region.

Record

References
 104 ทีมร่วมชิงชัย! แบโผผลจับสลาก ดิวิชั่น 3 ฤดูกาล 2016
 http://www.chiangmainews.co.th/page/archives/556187

External links
 Facebook-page

Association football clubs established in 2016
Football clubs in Thailand
Nong Bua Lamphu province
2016 establishments in Thailand